Sanyi Township is a rural township in southern Miaoli County, Taiwan. It is famous for its  (woodcarving) industry, earning it the name the Woodcarving Kingdom of Taiwan.

Geography
Sanyi is located in the mountains of northwestern Taiwan. On its northeastern boundary is Sanjiao Mountain at 567 meters, and to the east lies Huoyan Mountain at 602 meters. As of January 2023, its population was estimated to be 15,124.

Administrative divisions
The township comprises seven villages: Guangcheng, Liyutan, Longteng, Shengxing, Shuanghu, Shuangtan and Xihu.

Politics
The township is part of Miaoli County Constituency I electoral district for Legislative Yuan.

Economy
Initially, the Sanyi area produced timber and hides.  Later tung oil was extracted from the abundant tung trees and camphor from the camphor trees. Concurrently the wood carving industry developed. At one point, over 80% of local families were employed in wood carving. At the end of the 20th century Sanyi began developing a tourist industry.

Tourist attractions
 Shengxing Station, completed in 1905, is the highest station (402 meters) in Taiwan built along the "Old Mountain Railway". It was built entirely of wood, using no nails, and took five years to complete. The last train stopped at the station on 23 September 1987, because the steep route of the "Old Mountain Railway" could not accommodate the newer, larger trains. Nearby is a 726-meter train tunnel built in 1905. It has successfully withstood a large number of earthquakes, including the quake of 21 September 1999 (921). At the tunnel entrance are some old troop barracks where during World War II local troops were stationed to protect the railway.
 Sanyi Old Street and Mudiao
 Sanyi Wood Sculpture Museum, opened in 1995, shows the development of local wood carving from a craft in the late 19th century to contemporary art of the 21st century.
 Huoyan Mountain Ecology Museum displays detailed information about the geological formation of Huoyan Mountain, as well as the flora and fauna of the area.
 The Tung tree festival is held each year when the tung trees bloom in late April.
 Liyutan Dam
 Longteng Bridge
 West Lake Resortopia

Transportation

 TRA Sanyi Station
 TRA Shengxing Station
 TRA Yutengping Station

Notable natives
 Luo Shih-feng singer and television host

References

External links

  
 "The Story of a Small Town: Sanyi" Wesley Girls' High School in English

Townships in Miaoli County